Elva C  is a Chesapeake Bay deck boat, built in 1922 by Gilbert White, one of Virginia's best-known deck boat builders. She worked in fish trapping and in hauling. At one time, she hauled watermelons from North Carolina to Baltimore. She is ported at the Reedville Fisherman's Museum in Reedville, Virginia.

She was listed on the National Register of Historic Places in 2005.

References

Ships on the National Register of Historic Places in Virginia
1922 ships
National Register of Historic Places in Northumberland County, Virginia